Khirbet Mazin is an archaeological site on the shore of the Dead Sea.

Name
The site was called Khirbet Mazin by the first archaeologists after the name of a nearby wadi. It was later called Qasr el-Rubai and identified with Qasr el-Yahud or Khirbet el-Yahud.

Location
Khirbet Mazin (Metzad Kidron) is situated on the inlet north of Kidron stream.

History

Iron Age
The older part of ruins date to the end of the First Temple Period according to the 8th - 7th centuries BCE Israelite pottery found there.

Hasmonean period
Khirbet Mazin (Metzad Kidron) consists of the ruins of a fortress and anchorage. The fortress was enlarged and a dry dock was added during the Hasmonean times as part of their policy to rule the Dead Sea shores. Bronze coins and scraps from a shipwreck were founds outside of the anchorage.

See also
Archaeology of Israel

References

Medieval sites in Israel
Dead Sea